Alois Sokol (1914 – 11 September 1991) was a Czech fencer. He competed for Czechoslovakia in the individual and team sabre events at the 1948 Summer Olympics.

References

External links
 
 

1914 births
1991 deaths
Czech male fencers
Czechoslovak male fencers
Olympic fencers of Czechoslovakia
Fencers at the 1948 Summer Olympics
Place of birth missing